Marie-Agnès is a French feminine given name. It may refer to :
Marie-Agnès Courty, French geologist of the CNRS who works at the European Centre for Prehistoric Research in Tautavel
Marie-Agnès Gillot, French ballet dancer and choreographer
Marie-Agnès Labarre, member of the Senate of France

French feminine given names
Compound given names